John Goldthorpe was a professional rugby league footballer who played in the 1890s. He played , i.e. number 5, in Wakefield Trinity's first ever match in the Northern Union (now the Rugby Football League), the 0-11 defeat by Bradford F.C. during the inaugural 1895–96 season at Park Avenue, Bradford on Saturday 7 September 1895.

References

External links

 Search for "Goldthorpe" at rugbyleagueproject.org

Place of birth missing
Place of death missing
English rugby league players
Rugby league wingers
Wakefield Trinity players
Year of birth missing
Year of death missing